Christian Görlitz (1944 – 10 January 2022) was a German film director.

Filmography
 1984: Das Ende vom Anfang  (TV film) 
 1984: Auf einem langen Weg  (TV series)
 1985: Laufen, leiden, länger leben (TV-Miniseries)
 1985: Der Fahnder (TV series; 1 episode)
 1986: Die Lokomotive (TV film)
 1987: Die Bombe (TV film) (also Drehbuch)
 1988–1989: Großstadtrevier (TV series; 3 episodes)
 1991: Der Deal (TV film)
 1991: Unsere Hagenbecks (TV series; unknown episodes)
 1991: Müller und Miller (TV series; unknown episodes)
 1993: Der kleine Vampir (TV series; unknown episodes)
 1995: Der König (TV series; unknown episodes)
 1997: Große Freiheit (TV series; unknown episodes)
 1997: Freier Fall (TV film)
 1997: Einsatz Hamburg Süd (TV series; unknown episodes)
 1998: Das Böse (TV film)
 1998: Der König – Dr. med. Mord (TV film)
 1999: Der Preis der Sehnsucht (TV film)
 2000: Das gestohlene Leben (TV film)
 2000: Bella Block (TV series; 1 episode)
 2001: Klaras Hochzeit (aka Olivernbäume) (TV film)
 2001: Die Verbrechen des Professor Capellari (TV series; 1 episode)
 2001: Anwalt Abel (TV series; 2 episodes)
 2002: Mörderherz (TV film)
 2002: Mord im Haus des Herrn (TV film)
 2003: Nachts, wenn der Tag beginnt (TV film)
 2003: Die Geisel (TV film)
 2004: Das Duo (TV series; 1 episode)
 2004: Außer Kontrolle (TV film)
 2004: Kommissar Rex (TV series; 2 episodes)
 2006: Die Verlorenen (TV film)
 2006: Mutterglück (TV film)
 2008: 
 2008: Ein Job (TV film)

External links

References 

1944 births
2022 deaths
Film directors from Hamburg
German television directors
German screenwriters